Cristóbal del Río (born 11 March 1988) is a Chilean handball player for San Francisco CalHeat and a former Chilean national team athlete.

He is the founder and head coach in a Miami fitness company Move It Training, in which he helps his clients reach their fitness goals. He has been in the fitness industry for more than 15 years and helped more than a 1000 clients between Chile, Boston, Miami, and Naples.

Most important international tournaments:

- Superglobe 2021 Jeddah.

- 2 world championships (Spain 2013, Qatar 2015)

- 5 Pan-American tournaments 

- 2 South-American Games (Medellin 2010, Chile 2014)

- 1 Pre-Olympic qualification (Croatia 2011)

References

1988 births
Living people
Chilean male handball players
21st-century Chilean people
20th-century Chilean people